P. Lond.Lit.207 (BL P.Inv.Nr.230, TM 62310 / LDAB 3473) is a Greek fragment of a Septuagint manuscript written on papyrus in codex form. This manuscript discovered at Fayum, contains parts of the Book of Psalms. Palaeographycally it is dated to late third century or early fourth century (250 - 350 CE).

According to Don C. Barker, this papyrus proposes evidence about the origin of nomina sacra:

The manuscript is kept London, British Library (Brit. Mus. P. Inv. 230).

References 

3rd-century biblical manuscripts
4th-century biblical manuscripts
Psalms
Septuagint manuscripts
British Library collections